Emilio Ramon Pelayo Ejercito III (born October 5, 1963), commonly known as E. R. Ejercito, is a Filipino actor and former governor of Laguna from 2010 until his removal in 2014. Prior to his election as governor, he served as mayor of Pagsanjan, Laguna from 2001 until 2010. He is the son of actor George Estregan and the nephew of former President and former Manila Mayor Joseph Estrada.

Early life 
Born Emilio Ramon Pelayo Ejercito III on October 5, 1963 in San Juan, then a municipality of Rizal province, to actor Jesús Jorgé  Marcelo Ejercito (1939-1988) who went by the screen name George Estregan and Ramona Pelayo (1942-2020) from Ibajay, Aklan. He holds residence in Pagsanjan.

Education 
He studied at La Salle Green Hills for his primary and secondary education. He then studied at the University of the Philippines Diliman for his college education and earned a Bachelor of Fine Arts, Majoring in Advertising and Visual Communications.

Acting career 
In 1989, Ejercito began using the screen name "George Estregan Jr." and "Jorge Estregan", taken after his father's screen name, starring in the film Eagle Squad. He later went on to use Jeorge "E. R." Ejercito Estregan in his later acting career.

Political career 
He served as mayor of Pagsanjan, Laguna from 2001 until 2010. He then ran for governor in 2010 and 2013. On May 27, 2014, the Commission on Elections unseated Ejercito after alleged overspending during the campaign for the 2013 midterm elections. Three days later, his uncle, Joseph Estrada, convinced him to step down. Despite the conviction, he attempted a comeback as governor in 2016 and 2019 but lost on both occasions to incumbent Ramil Hernandez. He later transferred to Calamba, where he unsuccessfully ran for mayor in 2022.

On April 5, 2019, he was convicted and sentenced to 6 to 8 years in prison for graft over an anomalous insurance deal when he was mayor of Pagsanjan in 2008. The Sandiganbayan anti-graft court on August 7, 2019, upheld its earlier ruling that also barred Ejercito from holding public office.

Personal life
He is married to actress, former Mayor and Pagsanjan Vice Mayor Maita Sanchez (Girlie Ejercito in real life). They have 4 children: Eric Ejercito (born 1987), Jet Ejercito (born 1989), Jerico Ejercito (born 1992) and Jhulia Ejercito (born 2002).

Organizations
Vice President – Knights of the Altar (1982–1987) Became Altar Boy of 5 years at St. John the Baptist Parish Church, San Juan City
Vice President – KAPTT-Katipunan ng mga Artistang Pilipino sa Pelikula at Telebisyon or Philippine Cinema & Television Actors Guild, Inc. (1999–2002)
Member – Rotary Club of Pagsanjan, Laguna
Member – Carpa Club of Pagsanjan, Laguna

Filmography

Television
Heredero (1985-1987) – recurring role
IBC Headliners (2000) – news anchor
Ang Probinsyano (2021) - Guest Cast (Kapamilya Channel)

Film
Mga Paru-Parrong Bukid (1985) – Senen's brother
Haunted House (1985)
Bagets Gang (1986)
Bukas ng Sabo Agi Buka sa Sabitan (1986)
Kapitan Pablo: Cavite Killing Fields (1986) as Kapitan Pablo's son
Humanda Ka, Ikaw ang Sumuko (1987)
Target: Sparrow Unit (1987)
Boy Tornado (1987) - Boy's friend
Dongalo Massacre (1988)
Lost Command (1988)
Tumayo Ka't... Lumaban (1988)
Alega Gang: Public Enemy No.1 of Cebu (1988)
Ambush (1988)
Ang Supremo (1988)
Kumander Dante (1988)
Kumakasa... Kahit Nag-iisa (1988)
Kamandag ng Dagat (1988)
Alex Boncayao Brigade (1989)
Kontra Puwersa (1989)
Eagle Squad (1989) as Jet Espino
Isang Bala, Isang Buhay (1989) as Ex-commando
Bala... Dapat Kay Cris Cuenca (Public Enemy No.1 of Region 4) (1989)
Moises Platon (1989)
Gapos Gang (1989)
Kakampi Ko ang Diyos (1990)
Asiong Salonga Ikalawang Aklat (1990)
Urbanito Dizon: The Most Notorious Gangster in Luzon (1990) as Apache Gang Member
Ibabaon Kita sa Lupa (1990)
Hanggang Saan ang Tapang Mo? (1990) as Greg
Hukom. 45 (1990)
Hulihin si... Boy Amores (1990)
Alyas Pogi: Birador ng Nueva Ecija (1990) as Air-Con Gang Member
Inosente (1990)
Leon ng Maynila, Lt. Col. Romeo Maganto (1991)
Mayor Latigo: Ang Barakong Alkalde ng Baras (1991)
Captain Jaylo: Batas sa Batas (1991) as Dodong Sanggano
OXO vs Sigue-Sigue (1991)
Eddie Tagalog: Pulis Makati (1992)
Task Force Habagat (1992) as Alfredo "Joey" de Leon
Manila Boy (1993) as Ragoy's henchmen no. 2
Sala sa Init, Sala sa Lamig (1993) as Drug Pusher
Manchichirichit (1993)
Bukas Tatakpan Ka ng Dyaryo (1993)
Epimaco Velasco: NBI (1994) as One of the Big-4 Man (cameo appearance)
The Four Stooges (1995) as Stanley
Hatulan: Bilibid Boys II (1995)
Ang Titser Kong Pogi (1995) as Emilio the backdiving thug
Kahit Harangan ng Bala (1995) as Jigo Almonte
Mano Mano (1995)
Balawis (1996)
Kristo (1996) as St. Matthew
Batang Z (1996)
Bossing (1996)
Hagedorn (1996) as Totoy
Extranghero (1997) as Dr. Ivan
Pag-Ibig Ko sa Iyo'y Totoo (1997) as Mr. Diaz's son
Babasaging Kristal (1997)
Yes Darling: Walang Matigas na Pulis 2 (1997) as Kidnapper
Tuloy! Bukas ang Pinto! (1998)
Ang Maton at ang Showgirl (1998) as Valdez
Pakawalang Puso (1998)
Birador (1998) as Bank hold-up Gang
Jesus Salonga, Alyas Boy Indian (1998)
Cariño Brutal (1998)
Notoryus (1998)
Tulak ng Bibig, Kabig ng Dibdib (1998)
Hiwaga ng Panday (1998)
Type Kita ... Walang Kokontra! (1999) – Tong
Mamang Shotgun (1999) – Wilfredo
Abel Villarama: Armado (1999)
Makamandag Na Bala (2000)
Huwag Mong Takasan ang Batas (2002) 
Ang Panday (2009) as Apoykatawan
Si Agimat at si Enteng Kabisote (2010) as Magat
Manila Kingpin: The Asiong Salonga Story (2011) as Nicasio "Asiong" Salonga
This Guy's in Love with U Mare! (2012)
El Presidente (2012) as General Emilio Aguinaldo
Boy Golden: Shoot to Kill (2013) as Arturo "Boy Golden" Porcuna
Muslim Magnum .357: To Serve and Protect (2014) as Lt. Jamal Razul
Malvar: Tuloy ang Laban (upcoming) as Emilio Aguinaldo
Oplan Exodus: SAF 44 – For God and Country (upcoming)

Awards

Notes

References

External links

1963 births
Living people
21st-century Filipino male actors
E.R.
Tagalog people
E.R.
Filipino actor-politicians
Filipino male child actors
Visayan people
Filipino male comedians
Filipino male film actors
Filipino male television actors
Filipino Roman Catholics
Filipino television personalities
Governors of Laguna (province)
Male actors from Laguna (province)
Mayors of places in Laguna (province)
People from Laguna (province)
Pwersa ng Masang Pilipino politicians
University of the Philippines Diliman alumni